Model robots are model figures with origins in the Japanese anime genre of mecha. The majority of model robots are produced by Bandai and are based on the Gundam anime metaseries. This has given rise to the hobby's common name in Japan, Gunpla (or gan-pura, a Japanese portmanteau of "Gundam" and "plastic model"). Though there are exceptions, the model robot genre is dominated by anime tie-ins, with anime series and movies frequently serving as merchandising platform.

Construction
Hard plastic joints generally exhibit greater friction than polyvinyl joints, and are similarly more durable than styrene joints. ABS joints, however, require greater precision in tooling to ensure easy assembly, and in some cases, they require screws and a small gap between parts.

Gundam kits are the most common and popular variety of mecha models and so exemplify the general characteristics of models in the genre. Gundam kits are typically oriented toward beginners, and most often feature simple construction, simple designs, and rugged construction—less durable than a pre-assembled toy, but more durable than a true scale model. The result is that the majority of Gundam kits feature hands and other parts that favor poseability or easy assembly over accurate shape. They may also exhibit various draft-angle problems, and features like antennae that are oversized to prevent breakage. For the most part, other kit lines and other kit manufacturers in the genre follow suit, though there are exceptions.

Scale
Anime mecha subjects such as Gundam are most often portrayed as being between 15–20 meters tall, and so the kits are scaled in a manner that brings the subject to an economical and manageable size. For machines in this size range, scales of 1:100 and 1:144 are most common, with 1:60 being reserved for larger (and usually more expensive or elaborate) kits. For smaller subjects, scales such as 1:20, 1:35, and 1:72 are common. Bandai kits are commonly based upon fairly extensive and radical redesigns, rather than the original designs themselves. Some of this inconsistency representation may be due to the inherent difficulties in turning a 2-D cel-animated design into a 3-D design. Additionally, newer versions of the same mecha could be very different from an older version, due to better manufacturing technologies.

Practice
Gunpla is a major hobby in Japan, with entire magazines dedicated to variations on Bandai models. As mecha are fictional humanoid objects, there is considerable leeway for custom models and "kitbashes." A large amount of artistry goes into action poses and personalized variations on classic machines. There is also a market for custom resin kits which fill in gaps in the Bandai model line.

Gundam is not the only line of model robots. Eureka Seven, Neon Genesis Evangelion, Patlabor, Aura Battler Dunbine and Heavy Metal L-Gaim, to name a few, are all represented by Bandai model lines. Other manufacturers, such as Hasegawa, Wave, and Kotobukiya, have in recent years offered products from other series, such as Macross, Votoms, Five Star Stories, Armored Core, Virtual-On, Zoids, and Maschinen Krieger, with results rivaling Bandai's best products.

Scale modeling
-
Plastic toys